Sylvester Aidan Barrett (18 May 1926 – 8 May 2002) was an Irish Fianna Fáil politician. He served under Jack Lynch and Charles Haughey as Minister for the Environment (1977–1980) and Minister for Defence (1980–1981).

Sylvester Barrett was born in Darragh, near Ennis, County Clare, in 1926. His father Frank, who was a founder-member of Fianna Fáil, and his mother Delia Costello, both died in 1931. As a result, he was raised by an uncle and aunt. Barrett was educated at Ballyea National School and St Flannan's College in Ennis. He studied engineering at University College Galway, though did not complete his studies. He was a cadet in the Irish Army and later worked as a rate collector and an auctioneer.

He was elected to Dáil Éireann on 14 March 1968 at the by-election in the Clare constituency, held following the death of Fine Gael TD William Murphy. Barrett topped the poll at the general election the following year. At the 1973 general election Fianna Fáil lost office to a Fine Gael–Labour Party coalition government under Liam Cosgrave, and Barrett was appointed to the party's front bench as spokesperson on Transport and Power. After Fianna Fáil's landslide victory at the 1977 general election he was appointed to the cabinet as Minister for the Environment.

Barrett supported George Colley in the 1979 Fianna Fáil leadership election. Charles Haughey was the eventual victor, but Barrett was retained in the cabinet in the Environment position. Following a reshuffle in 1980 he was appointed Minister for Defence. After the February 1982 general election Fianna Fáil were returned to office, but Barrett was not appointed to cabinet. However, he was appointed a Minister of State at the Department of Finance.

In October 1982, when Charlie McCreevy put down a motion of no confidence in Haughey's leadership, Barrett was the only Minister of State among the so-called Gang of 22 who supported it; Haughey survived, and did not dismiss Barrett from office.

The following month he topped the poll at the November 1982 general election. Fianna Fáil were out of government again, and Barrett was appointed to the front bench as spokesperson on Defence. He remained there until 1984, when he won a seat in the Munster constituency at the European Parliament election and was replaced on the front bench by Noel Treacy. He did not contest either the 1987 general election or the 1989 European Parliament election, and retired from politics. He died on 8 May 2002.

References

External links

 

1926 births
2002 deaths
Fianna Fáil MEPs
Fianna Fáil TDs
Irish Army soldiers
Irish auctioneers
Members of the 18th Dáil
Members of the 19th Dáil
Members of the 20th Dáil
Members of the 21st Dáil
Members of the 22nd Dáil
Members of the 23rd Dáil
Members of the 24th Dáil
MEPs for the Republic of Ireland 1984–1989
Ministers for Defence (Ireland)
Ministers for the Environment (Ireland)
Ministers of State of the 23rd Dáil
People educated at St Flannan's College
Politicians from County Clare
People associated with the University of Galway